Courtney Brown (born 21 April 1965) is a Canadian former sprinter. He competed in the men's 200 metres at the 1988 Summer Olympics.

References

External links
 
 

1965 births
Living people
Athletes (track and field) at the 1988 Summer Olympics
Canadian male sprinters
Olympic track and field athletes of Canada
World Athletics Championships athletes for Canada
Black Canadian track and field athletes
Jamaican emigrants to Canada
People from Clarendon Parish, Jamaica